Jorge Renán Benguché Ramírez (born 21 May 1996) is a Honduran professional footballer who plays as a striker for Olimpia and the Honduras national team.

Club career
Benguché made his debut on 12 October 2014, in a 3–0 win against C.D. Victoria. He came on as a 56th minute substitute for Anthony Lozano and scored his first goal eight minutes later.

On 7 August 2015, Benguché was loaned to Juticalpa F.C. He made his debut two days later in a 2–0 home win against Real España.

On 9 January 2018, Benguché joined Lobos UPNFM on a year-long loan. His first appearance for the side came on 28 January in a 2–1 home win over Vida. He scored his first goal on 7 February in a 1–0 away win over Real España.

On 17 August 2020, Benguché signed for Portuguese club Boavista F.C. on loan for the entire season. He made his league debut the following 19 September in a 3–3 draw against C.D. Nacional. Benguché scored his first goal on 12 December, a late consolation in a 2–1 away loss to G.D. Estoril Praia in the Taça de Portugal.

On 4 January 2022, Benguché signed with Uruguayan club Cerro Largo F.C. on a one-year contract.

International career
Benguché was called up to the national team by head coach Fabián Coito for friendlies against Puerto Rico and Chile in September 2019. He made his national team debut on 6 September 2019 in 4–0 win against Puerto Rico. He started the game and scored two goals before getting substituted for Alberth Elis at 74th minute of the game.

Career statistics

International

International goals
Scores and results list Honduras' goal tally first.

Honours 
Olimpia
Liga Nacional de Fútbol Profesional de Honduras: Clausura 2015, Apertura 2019, Apertura 2021

CONCACAF League: 2017

References

External links
 

1996 births
Living people
People from Yoro Department
Association football forwards
Honduran footballers
Honduras international footballers
Liga Nacional de Fútbol Profesional de Honduras players
Primeira Liga players
Uruguayan Primera División players
C.D. Olimpia players
Juticalpa F.C. players
Lobos UPNFM players
Boavista F.C. players
Cerro Largo F.C. players
Garifuna people
Honduran expatriate footballers
Honduran expatriate sportspeople in Portugal
Honduran expatriate sportspeople in Uruguay
Expatriate footballers in Portugal
Expatriate footballers in Uruguay
Footballers at the 2020 Summer Olympics
Olympic footballers of Honduras